Hadronyche annachristiae is a species in the spider genus Hadronyche, species of which are common in Australia. Hadronyche is a genus of the family Atracidae. Hadronyche annachristiae has a specific carapace color pattern.

References 

Atracidae
Spiders of Australia
Spiders described in 2010